Wilbur D. Bascomb Jr. is an American bass guitarist. He is the son of jazz trumpeter Wilbur "Dud" Bascomb, who played with Erskine Hawkins and Duke Ellington.

Career
In the 1970s, Bascomb worked with James Brown(1974), then recorded on the album Wired (1976) by Jeff Beck. During the next year, he released the solo album Wilbur Bascomb and Future Dreams. He has worked with Frank Owens, Galt McDermot, Roy Ayers, George Benson, Hank Crawford, Bo Diddley, B.B. King, Bernard Purdie, Mick Taylor, and Players Association.

Discography

As leader
 1977 Wilbur Bascomb and Future Dreams

As sideman
With George Benson
 1975 Good King Bad (CTI)
 1978 Space Album

With Rusty Bryant
 1973 For the Good Times
 1974 Until It's Time for You to Go (Prestige)

With Hank Crawford
 1983 Indigo Blue
 1984 Down on the Deuce
 1985 Roadhouse Symphony
 1986 Mr. Chips
Night Beat (Milestone, 1989)
Groove Master (Milestone, 1990)
 1993 South Central
After Dark (Milestone, 1998)
With Joey DeFrancesco
Where Were You? (Columbia, 1990)
With Bo Diddley
Big Bad Bo (Chess, 1974)

With Lou Donaldson
 1973 Sassy Soul Strut
 1974 Sweet Lou
With Bunky Green
Transformations (Vanguard, 1977)
With Rupert Holmes
 1974 Widescreen
 1978 Pursuit of Happiness

With Etta Jones
 1989 Sugar (Muse)
 1990 Christmas with Etta Jones (Muse)

With Galt MacDermot
 1998 El Nino
 2000 Spotted Owl
 2003 Up from the Basement

With Jimmy McGriff
McGriff Avenue (Milestone, 2002)
With Blue Mitchell
Many Shades of Blue (Mainstream, 1974)

With Idris Muhammad
 1976 House of the Rising Sun 
 1977 Turn This Mutha Out
 1979 Fox Huntin' 

With David "Fathead" Newman
Keep the Dream Alive (Prestige, 1978)
Scratch My Back (Prestige, 1979)
With Frank Owens
Brown'n Serve (1973)

With Houston Person
Suspicions (Muse, 1980)
Heavy Juice (Muse, 1982)
Always on My Mind (Muse, 1985)
Christmas with Houston Person & Etta Jones (1997)

With Bernard Purdie
 2001 King of the Beat
 2003 Lialeh

With Big Mama Thornton
 1975 Sassy Mama!
 1978 Mama's Pride

With Reuben Wilson
Got To Get Your Own (1975)
Movin' On (Savant, 2006)

With others
 1972 The Essence of Mystery, Alphonse Mouzon
 1972 Dig This, Bobbi Humphrey
 1973 Donato Deodato, Joao Donato
 1973 From the Depths of My Soul, Marlena Shaw
 1973 Lean on Him, Buddy Terry (Mainstream)
 1974 Experience and Judgment, Andy Bey
 1974 Big Bad Bo, Bo Diddley
 1974 Change Up the Groove, Roy Ayers
 1974 The Fourth Dimension, Jack McDuff
 1974 Keepin' up with the Joneses, The Joneses
 1974 Reality, James Brown
 1975 Chuck Berry, Chuck Berry
 1975 Got to Get Your Own, Reuben Wilson
 1975 Michael Bolton, Michael Bolton
 1976 Transformations, Bunky Green
 1976 Tymes Up, The Tymes
 1976 Wired, Jeff Beck
 1977 Cinnamon Flower, Charlie Rouse
 1977 Herbie Mann and Fire Island, Herbie Mann
 1977 Lady Put the Light Out, Frankie Valli
 1977 Portfolio, Grace Jones
 1977  The Mysterious Flying Orchestra, The Mysterious Flying Orchestra
 1978 Born to Dance, Players Association
 1979 Hair: Original Soundtrack Recording
 1979 Midnight Rendezvous, Tasha Thomas
 1981 There Must Be a Better World Somewhere, B.B. King
 1984 Live at Carnegie Hall & Montreaux, Switzerland, Teresa Brewer
 1986 Midnight Lady Called the Blues, Jimmy Witherspoon
 1988 Today's Love Songs Tomorrow's Blues, Arthur Prysock
 1989 Hot Tat, Richard Holmes
 1990 Stranger in This Town, Mick Taylor
 1990 Where Were You?, Joey DeFrancesco
 1992 Crazy for You, John Hicks
 1992 I'll Take Care of You, Cissy Houston/Chuck Jackson
 1992 I'm Ready, Lucky Peterson
 1996 Blue Guru, Jon Tiven
 1998 Blue Breakbeats, Bobbi Humphrey
 1999 As Phat as It Gets, Leslie West

References

External links
 

American jazz bass guitarists
American male bass guitarists
People from Orange County, New York
20th-century American bass guitarists
Jazz musicians from New York (state)
20th-century American male musicians
American male jazz musicians